Eddy De Lépine (born 30 March 1984 in Fort-de-France, Martinique) is a French sprinter. Together with Ladji Doucouré, Ronald Pognon, and Lueyi Dovy, he won a gold medal in 4 x 100 metres relay at the 2005 World Championships in Athletics.

He finished 6th in the 200m at the 2006 European Athletics Championships in Gothenburg.

Personal bests
100 metres - 10.19 (2003)
200 metres - 20.62 (2004)

External links

1984 births
Living people
Sportspeople from Fort-de-France
Martiniquais athletes
French male sprinters
Olympic athletes of France
Athletes (track and field) at the 2004 Summer Olympics
French people of Martiniquais descent
World Athletics Championships medalists
World Athletics Championships winners